The Great One may refer to:

People 
 Alberto Contador (born 1982), Spanish professional cyclist
 Roberto Clemente (1934–1972), Hall of Fame Major League Baseball player
 Jackie Gleason (1916–1987), American comedian and actor
 Wayne Gretzky (born 1961), Canadian ice hockey player
 Stephen Hendry (born 1969), Scottish professional snooker player
 Dwayne Johnson (born 1972), also known as The Rock, actor and professional wrestler
 Rob Leatham (born 1961), professional shooter and 16-time USPSA national champion
 Mark Levin (born 1957), conservative radio talk show host
 Bob Maher, Jr. (born 1978), American professional Magic: The Gathering player
 Charles Caprino (born 1927), American sign sales professional, legendary

Literature 
 Great Ones, fictional characters from H. P. Lovecraft's Dreamlands
 The leader of the spiders in the Doctor Who story Planet of the Spiders

Other uses 
 The Babylonian name for the constellation Aquarius
 The English translation of the Dena'ina name Denali, a mountain in Denali Park, Alaska

See also 
 The Next One
 List of people known as The Great

Lists of people by nickname
Nicknames in cycling
Nicknames in hockey
Nicknames in sports